Ben Turner (born 3 February 1980) is a British Iranian actor, most notable for his roles as nurse Jay Faldren on BBC's Casualty, the lead role of Amir in multiple stage adaptations of The Kite Runner, and as Louis XV in Doctor Who.

Life and career
Turner was born in Hackney, London to an English father, actor Graham Turner of the Royal Shakespeare Company, and an Iranian mother. He was educated at Dulwich College, well known for its pedigree of actors including the founder Edward Alleyn. He then trained as an actor at Guildhall School of Music and Drama.

He has appeared in many productions in television, film, theatre and radio, including Michael Grandage's production of Richard II.

He has also appeared in several charity shows such as Children in Need, 2009 in the Casualty special as Staff Nurse Jay Faldren and also Let's Dance for Sport Relief 2010.

Ben appeared in the first of the live shows along with Casualty stars Charles Dale (Big Mac) and Tony Marshall (Noel Garcia) as well as Holby City stars Rosie Marcel (Jac Naylor) and Luke Roberts (Joseph Byrne). He left Casualty in December 2011, along with co-star Georgia Taylor, who played his main love interest in the show.

Following his extensive stage experience Turner took on "without doubt the biggest challenge I've had professionally", appearing in the stage production of The Kite Runner, which had its European premiere at Nottingham Playhouse in April 2013. Turner starred in the production playing both the younger and older versions of the main character Amir. The show's popularity returned it for another run with a UK tour premiering August through November, 2014 and again in the West End in 2016.

Turner joined the cast of WPC 56, in the regular lead role of Detective Inspector Max Harper, in Series 2, which was shown by the BBC in February 2014.

Filmography

References

External links 

Living people
1980 births
Alumni of the Guildhall School of Music and Drama
British male actors of Asian descent
English male film actors
English male radio actors
English male stage actors
English male television actors
English male voice actors
English people of Iranian descent
Male actors from London
People educated at Dulwich College
People from Hackney Central